The King Long Kaige is a series of light commercial van produced by the Chinese automobile manufacturer King Long based on the Chassis of the King Long Jinwei as a more premium solution. The King Long Kaige has since been available in a wide range of body configurations, including a minivan/MPV, minibus, panel van, crew van, and an ambulance.

Overview

There are three engine options for the King Long Kaige including a 2.4 liter inline-four engine producing 139 hp, a 2.5 liter turbo inline-four engine producing 116 hp, and a 2.7 liter inline-four engine producing 163 hp.

There are two versions of the King Long Kaige, including the standard King Long Kaige with 6,7,8,9,11,13, and 14 seater configurations and the larger King Long Kaige K6 with 17 and 18 seater configurations.

Golden Dragon variants
Just like several other King Long products, a version was also sold under the Golden Dragon brand by Xiamen Golden Dragon Bus Co. Ltd called the Golden Dragon X5 (wide body variant) and Golden Dragon Z4 (Z-series, narrow body variant). The Golden Dragon X5 was also sold as the Higer H5C.

Overseas market

Malyasia market
The King Long Kaige in China was launched in Malaysia in around 2011 as the King Long Farid, and later dropped the King Long name in favor of CAM, which stands for China Auto Manufacturers, the Malaysian company in charge of distributing the King Long products. The CAM Placer-X is the model name used in Malaysia, while the styling is shared with the Joylong A-series vans, the version sold by Joylong in China.

Jamaican market
The version sold in Jamaica was renamed as the King Long Kingo.

Controversies
The designs of the King Long Kaige is controversial as they heavily resemble the fifth generation Toyota HiAce (H200) with similar body styles and overall vehicle dimensions. The King Long Kaige are among the various Chinese vans from domestic brands that chose to replicate the Toyota HiAce H200 vans with only minor styling differences. Other brands include government owned manufacturers including Jinbei and Foton.

References

External links 

http://www.kinglongvan.com.cn - King Long official site. (China)

Kaige
Minibuses
Cab over vehicles
Vans
2010s cars